Cylindera brevis is an extant species of tiger beetle in the genus Cylindera.

References

brevis
Beetles described in 1905